'''Amanda Beatriz Olivares Phillip' (born March 3, 1966, in Puebla, Mexico) is a Mexican beauty pageant titleholder who represented her country in the 1988 Miss Universe pageant, held in Taipei, Taiwan on May 23, 1988, and obtained the second runner-up. Amanda married and always wanted to be a Home maker, Mother and Wife...

During Miss Universe, Amanda Olivares was also the only contestant from the Americas, as well as the only non-Asian to make it into the top five that year. She is the best friend of Mercedes Rodriguez Silva, Gabriela Silva, Laura Ortega and Zandra Rodríguez. Amanda has 3 daughters; Amanda, Joyce and Tania Tame Olivares. She is happily married to Esteban Pedroche Gomez and is still living in her Home Town Puebla in Mexico.

References

1966 births
Living people
Mexican beauty pageant winners
Mexican people of Welsh descent
Miss Universe 1988 contestants
People from Puebla